127th meridian may refer to:

127th meridian east, a line of longitude east of the Greenwich Meridian
127th meridian west, a line of longitude west of the Greenwich Meridian